Dickenson's Arcade Pty Ltd v Tasmania, also known as the Tobacco Tax case is a High Court of Australia case that dealt with section 90 of the Australian Constitution.

In this case, the Act in question imposed licences for the sale of tobacco, and the fee was calculated as being 4.5 percent of the retail value of tobacco sold in the 12-month period ending 6 months prior to the licence period. Three judges, namely Gibbs, Menzies and Stephen JJ, applied the criterion of liability approach from Dennis Hotels Pty Ltd v Victoria and held that the fee was not an excise and thus not invalid by section 90. Barwick CJ and Mason J, while disapproving of the criterion of liability approach, felt bound to follow the precedent set by Dennis Hotels, since the facts of that cases were quite similar to those in this case.

The Court, with the exception of McTiernan J, excluded consumption taxes from duties of excise, although such taxes are frequently also a tax on the sale of goods.

See also 

 Section 90 of the Constitution of Australia
 Australian constitutional law

References 

 Winterton, G. et al. Australian federal constitutional law: commentary and materials, 1999. LBC Information Services, Sydney.

High Court of Australia cases
1974 in Australian law
Australian constitutional law
Excise in the Australian Constitution cases
1974 in case law